was an entrepreneur and politician, who served as the final Minister of Commerce and Industry and first Minister of Economy, Trade and Industry in post-war Japan.

Inagaki was born in the city of Okayama. He graduated from the Economics Department of Keio University in 1913. Although he received a job offer from Mitsui Bussan, he was recruited personally by Furukawa Toranosuke, the president of the Fukukawa zaibatsu and went to work for Furukawa instead. During World War I, he was sent to Germany, where he negotiated a joint-venture, which Fuji Electric in 1923. Afterwards, he became a director of the Jiji Shimpo newspaper (1932), director of Yokohama Rubber Company (1942), president of Yokohama Rubber (1945) and chairman of Yokohama Rubber (1947).

In 1947, Inagaki was elected to a seat in the Diet of Japan in 1947 Upper House election under the Minshutō banner. He supported efforts to join with the Liberal Democratic Party (LDP) in a coalition government in 1949, and became the final Minister of Commerce and Industry and first Minister of Economy, Trade and Industry under the 3rd Shigeru Yoshida administration. In this post, he advised the American occupation authorities that he foresaw a time when China would become Japan’s most important trading partner.

Inagaki joined with Kamejiro Hayashida in 1950 to form the Minshu Kurabu (Democratic Club), which later merged with the Liberal Party. However, in the 1953 Upper House election, he chose to run as an independent, but was not elected.

Afterwards, Inagaski served as chairman of the Japan Foreign Trade Council (JFTC), chairman of Nippon Broadcasting System, chairman of Nippon Zeon Corporation, and as a director of the Institute of National Policy Research. He attempted a return to politics in the 1962 Japanese House of Councillors election under the LDP banner, but failed to secure a seat. He was awarded the Order of the Sacred Treasure, 1st class in 1971.

References
Kudo, Akira. Japanese-German Business Relations: Co-operation and Rivalry in the Interwar Era. Routledge Japanese Studies Series. (2002) 
Nara, Hiroshia, Yoshida Shigeru: Last Meiji Man. Rowman & Littlefield. (2007) 
Scaller, Michael. The American Occupation of Japan: The Origins of the Cold War in Asia. Oxford University Press (1988) 
Shimizu, Sayuri. Creating People of Plenty. Kent State University Press (2001) 
Watanabe, Tsuneo. Japan's Backroom Politics: Factions in a Multiparty Age. Lexington Books (2013)

Notes

1888 births
1976 deaths
People from Okayama
Members of the House of Peers (Japan)
20th-century Japanese businesspeople
Government ministers of Japan
Keio University alumni
Recipients of the Order of the Sacred Treasure, 1st class